"The Best Thing" is the second single off Relient K's fifth studio album, Five Score and Seven Years Ago. The band's manager announced it on their messageboard on March 17, 2007, along with Capitol Records announcing it on several websites. The song was performed on The Tonight Show with Jay Leno on April 12, 2007. It was released to Top 40 and Hot AC stations on April 10. Matt Thiessen, the lead singer, has described the song as, "The anti-Daniel Powter 'Bad Day' song, it's straight up positive." The song peaked at No. 47 on the Top 40 charts.

Around mid-February 2008, the song was released to Christian Hit Radio. It was the 18th most-played song of 2008 on U.S. Contemporary Christian music radio stations according to R&R magazine's Christian CHR chart. The song was included on the WOW Hits 2009 compilation album.

Promotional use
The song was used for promotion of ABC's Fall preview week. The commercial features the intro to the song and the chorus while showing clips of the ABC hit shows.

Music video

The band originally announced the video when they said that the music video for the song was shot on April 13, 2007.  They announced this at their show at the Avalon with Mae and Sherwood in Hollywood the day of the shoot.

Early screenshots released by the band suggested that this video takes place in an abandoned building or apartment. Upon the video's release on May 30, 2007, it was revealed that the video's main theme is a girl taking pictures, which turn out to be of the band performing. The pictures that pop up show all the band members playing. The pictures piece together throughout the video, sometimes showing separate members, and sometimes showing multiple views of the same member. It is somewhat made up of animation, which is something Matt Thiessen had wanted in one of their videos. It is the only Relient K video where drummer Dave Douglas is shown singing backing vocals with a microphone, despite the fact that he sings backing vocals for all the songs the band has released videos for since Douglas joined the band. This is also the first video where Matt Thiessen is seen playing the piano, despite the fact that he has piano parts in the previous three songs that the band has made into videos. As of this video, guitarist Jon Schneck and bassist John Warne have officially been in more Relient K videos (four total) than longtime Relient K bassist Brian Pittman, who was in the band's first three videos. The video is up to more than 850,000 viewings on YouTube.

Track listing
US promo CD
The Best Thing - 3:29

References

Sources
Gordon Robertson."Rock Relient K" Gotee Records CBN.com<http://www.cbn.com/cbnmusic/artists/relientk.aspx> Web. 7 April 2012

Kevin."Relient K- Five Scores and Seven Years Ago"<http://www.cmspin.com/newsmanager/anmviewer.asp?a=4101&z=5> Web. 3 February 2007

NRTAdmin. "Relient K Artist Profile" <http://www.newreleasetuesday.com/artistdetail.php?artist_id=55> Web. 20 April 2010

Flanders, Kim. " Relient K Exclusive Interview" <http://www.cmusicweb.com/modernrock/relientk/interview.shtml> Web 16 February 2003

External links

2007 songs
Relient K songs
Songs written by Matt Thiessen
2007 singles
Capitol Records singles
Gotee Records singles
Song recordings produced by Howard Benson